Admir Džubur (13 June 1964 – 23 November 2020) was a Bosnian businessman and football administrator.

He was president of Bosnian Premier League club Željezničar from 29 June 2019 until his death on 23 November 2020, from complications caused by COVID-19, amid the COVID-19 pandemic in Bosnia and Herzegovina.

Džubur was also the director of KJKP "Toplane – Sarajevo".

References

External links
Admir Džubur at Klix.ba

1964 births
2020 deaths
Businesspeople from Sarajevo
Bosniaks of Bosnia and Herzegovina
Bosnia and Herzegovina chairpersons of corporations
FK Željezničar Sarajevo presidents
Deaths from the COVID-19 pandemic in Bosnia and Herzegovina